Cəyirli (also, Dzhagirli, Dzhagyrli, and Dzheirli) is a village and municipality in the Gobustan Rayon of Azerbaijan.  It has a population of 2,424.

References 

Populated places in Gobustan District